Islam Mohamed Ramadan Rashad (born November 1, 1990), known as Milo, is an Egyptian Footballer. He plays as a left back for Egyptian Premier League.

Career

On May 28, 2012, it was announced that French Ligue 1 giants Olympique Lyonnais had shown interest in the player after showing a phenomenal performance at the 2012 Toulon Tournament in France. Sporting and Benfica, along with Premier League giants Arsenal, had also begun to show interest in signing the player after another good performance at the 2012 Arab Nations Cup, despite Egypt's poor finish in the regional tournament. Ramadan was surprised that these many clubs had so much interest in him and later expressed his desire that he would like to join Arsenal.  He played for Egypt at the 2012 Summer Olympics. 

In the summer 2019, Milo joined Ala'ab Damanhour SC.

References

1990 births
Living people
Egyptian footballers
Egypt international footballers
Association football defenders
Egyptian Premier League players
Haras El Hodoud SC players
Al-Ahli SC (Tripoli) players
El Entag El Harby SC players
El Raja SC players
Olympic Club (Egypt) players
Olympic footballers of Egypt
Footballers at the 2012 Summer Olympics
Sportspeople from Alexandria
Libyan Premier League players